Wier is a fairly uncommon surname in the United States.  It traces ancestry from the Weir clan in Scotland.  There are several variants of the name, but all supposedly go back to de Vere, a British noble family originally of Norman ancestry, from the eponymous town of Ver.

Notable persons with the surname Wier include:
 Allen Wier (born 1946), American writer and professor
 Benjamin Wier, Canadian businessman and politician
 Daniel Wier (1772–1842), Canadian farmer and political figure
 Dara Wier (born 1949), American poet
 Ester Wier (born 1910), American writer
 John Wier (disambiguation), several persons
 Murray Wier (born 1926), American basketball player
 Roy Wier (1888–1963), American politician
 Rusty Wier (1944–2009), American singer-songwriter

See also
 Weyer (disambiguation)